Bâgé-la-Ville is a former commune in the Ain department in eastern France. On 1 January 2018, it was merged into the new commune of Bâgé-Dommartin.

Geography
Bâgé-la-Ville is in the heart of Bresse, between Bourg-en-Bresse and Mâcon.

It is the largest commune in the department in terms of area.

Population

See also
Communes of the Ain department

Personalities
Louis Duret, court physician

References

Former communes of Ain
Populated places disestablished in 2018
Bresse